Janni Jønsson (born 1968) is a Danish former cricketer who played as a right-handed batter and right-arm medium bowler. She appeared in 32 One Day Internationals for Denmark between 1989 and 1999, and captained the side between 1983 and 1999. She played domestic cricket for Sussex.

References

External links
 
 

1968 births
Living people
Danish women cricketers
Denmark women One Day International cricketers
Danish women cricket captains
Sussex women cricketers